Quintus Aemilius Papus (fl. 282 BC275 BC), a member of the gens Aemilia - an ancient ruling class — of the Papus family, was a Roman general and statesman.

Career
Quintus Aemilius Papus was elected consul for 282 BC and 278, both times with Gaius Fabricius Luscinus as his colleague. During his first consulship, Papus successfully warred against the Boii in Northern Italy. In 280 he and Fabricius were amongst the three ambassadors who were sent to Pyrrhus of Epirus. Papus was elected censor in 275 BC, again with Luscinus as his colleague.

Family
According to William Smith, Quintus Aemilius Papus was the grandfather of Lucius Aemilius Papus. This, however, contradicts information derived from the younger man's filiation which was Lucius Aemilius Q.f. Cn.n. Papus, or Lucius Aemilius, son of Quintus, grandson of Gnaeus (or Cnaieus).  Quintus was thus either father of Lucius Aemilius Papus, or a patrilineal relative.

Anecdote about Papus
Valerius Maximus, writing much later, said that there was silver in the homes of Gaius Fabricius [Luscinus] and Quintus Aemilius Papus, the leading men of their era. Each of them had a dish for the gods and a salt cellar, but Fabricius was more elegant because he chose to put a little pedestal of horn under his dish. Papus behaved rather assertively when he inherited those items, because he decided on account of their religious significance that he would not get rid of them.

References

Roman censors
Papus, Quintus
3rd-century BC Roman consuls